George Goad (4 April 1806 – 1878) was an English cricketer.  Goad's batting and bowling styles are unknown.  He was born at Brighton, Sussex.

Goad made his first-class debut for Sussex against Kent in 1826.  He made six further first-class appearances for the county, the last of which came against England in 1834.  In his six first-class matches, he took 7 wickets, though his bowling average and best figures are unknown due to incomplete records.  With the bat, he scored 21 runs at an average of 1.50, with a high score of 6.

He died at the town of his birth in 1878.

References

External links
George Goad at ESPNcricinfo
George Goad at CricketArchive

1806 births
1878 deaths
Sportspeople from Brighton
English cricketers
Sussex cricketers
English cricketers of 1826 to 1863